The Lindenau-Museum is an art museum in Altenburg, Thuringia, Germany. It originated as the house-museum of baron and collector Bernhard August von Lindenau. The building was completed in 1876.

The museum's main attraction is its collection of Italian paintings from the late Gothic and early Renaissance age (13th–15th centuries), which are among the largest outside Italy. The artworks include Filippo Lippi's St. Jerome in Penance, Sandro Botticelli's Portrait of Caterina Sforza and a predella panel by Fra Angelico. It also keeps ancient antiquities and modern works, and has a library.

The museum is a member of the Konferenz Nationaler Kultureinrichtungen, a union of more than twenty cultural institutions in the former East Germany.

Sources

External links
Official website (in German)

Museums in Thuringia
Altenburg
Art museums and galleries in Germany
Art museums established in 1976
1976 establishments in East Germany